Sahar Dbouk (born 5 October 1985) is a Lebanese football player and coach who plays as a centre-back for Lebanese club Super Girls, of whom she is also the chairman, and is head coach of the Lebanon women's national under-16 team. She represented Lebanon internationally.

Club career
Dbouk joined Lebanese Women's Football League side Ansar in 2006, remaining at the club until 2009 when she joined Sadaka. She stayed at Sadaka until their dissolution in 2014. Dbouk was nominated Best Player of the Lebanese Women's Football League for the 2012 season.

International career
Dbouk represented Lebanon in multiple competitions, namely the 2006 Arab Women's Championship, the 2007 WAFF Women's Championship, and the 2014 AFC Women's Asian Cup qualification in 2013, where she played three games and scored one goal against Kuwait.

Managerial career
Dbouk was head coach of the Lebanon women's national under-16 team (Lebanon B) at the 2022 WAFF U-18 Girls Championship. She helped Lebanon U16 retain their title at the 2022 WAFF U-16 Championship, after defeating Jordan 2–0 in the final.

Career statistics

International
Scores and results list Lebanon's goal tally first, score column indicates score after each Dbouk goal.

Honours

Player
Ansar
 Lebanese Women's FA Cup runner-up: 2007–08, 2008–09

Sadaka
 Lebanese Women's Football League: 2008–09, 2009–10, 2010–11, 2011–12, 2012–13
 Lebanese Women's FA Cup: 2008–09, 2009–10, 2010–11, 2011–12

Lebanon
 WAFF Women's Championship third place: 2007

Manager
Lebanon U16
 WAFF U-16 Championship: 2022

See also
 List of Lebanon women's international footballers

References

External links
 
 

1985 births
Living people
People from Tyre, Lebanon
Lebanese women's footballers
Women's association football central defenders
Lebanon women's international footballers
Lebanese Women's Football League players
Al Ansar FC (women) players
Sadaka SC women's footballers
Super Girls FC players
Lebanese football managers
Female association football managers
Women's association football managers